The 1988 UCI Track Cycling World Championships were the World Championship for track cycling. They took place in Ghent, Belgium from 21 to 25 August 1988. Eight events were contested, 7 for men (5 for professionals, 2 for amateurs) and 1 for women with a demonstration non-Championship points race for women.

Medal summary

Medal table

See also
 1988 UCI Road World Championships

References

Uci Track Cycling World Championships, 1988
Track cycling
UCI Track Cycling World Championships by year
International cycle races hosted by Belgium